Live At Stora Teatern is a live EP by Jens Lekman. It was recorded 21 April – 6 November 2004, at Stora Teatern, Göteborg.

Track listing
"You Are The Light" (3:40)
"I Saw Her In The Anti-War Demonstration" (2:48)
"Psychogirl" (5:38)
"They Should Have Given You The Oscar" [written by Gerry Goffin/ Carole King] (2:25) 
"F-Word" (4:15)
"Julie" (4:50)
"Happy Birthday, Dear Friend Lisa" (4:13)

Jens Lekman EPs
2005 EPs
Live EPs
2005 live albums
Secretly Canadian live albums
Secretly Canadian EPs